Adult Learning is a quarterly peer-reviewed academic journal that covers the field of adult education. Adult Learning is an international, peer-reviewed, practice-oriented journal. The journal publishes empirical research and conceptual papers that approach practice issues with a problem-solving emphasis. The audience includes practitioners and researchers who design, manage, teach, and evaluate programs for adult learners in a variety of settings. The journal's editors are Davin Carr-Chellman (University of Dayton), Lilian H. Hill (University of Southern Mississippi), and Carol Rogers-Shaw (University of Dayton). The journal is published by SAGE Publications on behalf of the American Association for Adult and Continuing Education.

Abstracting and indexing 
The journal is abstracted and indexed in:  
 Academic Search
 EBSCO databases
 ERIC
 ProQuest databases
 InfoTrac
 SCOPUS

External links 
 
 American Association for Adult and Continuing Education 

SAGE Publishing academic journals
English-language journals
Special education journals
Publications established in 1977
Quarterly journals